Nøddebo Præstegård (Noedebo vicarage) is a Danish film from 1974, written and instructed by Peer Guldbrandsen, based on the novel Ved Nytaarstid i Nøddebo Præstegaard by Henrik Scharling and the stage play by Elith Reumert. It's a remake of the 1934 film. Its shot on location around Greve Præstegård close to Greve Strand in Northeast Sjælland.

Cast
Lars Høy
Jens Brenaa
Michael Lindvad
Poul Bundgaard
Birgitte Federspiel
Merete Voldstedlund
Lisbet Dahl
Arthur Jensen
Ulf Pilgaard
Paul Hagen
Kirsten Rolffes
Karl Stegger
Karen Lykkehus
Judy Gringer 
Lizzi Varencke
Ebba With
Susanne Jagd
Lise Thomsen

References

External links

 Trailer on Youtube

1974 films
Danish comedy-drama films
1970s Danish-language films
Films directed by Peer Guldbrandsen